Natwar Goyal is an Indian politician and former state minister of Uttar Pradesh. He is the current vice president of All India Vaish Federation. Goyal is a former chairperson of Khadi Gram Udyog.

Political career
Natwar Goyal has started his political career in 2011 with Samajwadi Party. He was appointed as Minister of State of Uttar Pradesh Khadi Gram Udyog in 2012 by the party.

He was elected as Uttar Pradesh vice president of All India Vaish Federation in 2012. After serving ten years with the organization Goyal is re-elected as vice president of All India Vaish Federation in 2022.

References

Uttar Pradesh politicians
Living people
1967 births
Samajwadi Party politicians from Uttar Pradesh